Brave Family, is a South Korean reality-variety show that airs on KBS2 beginning 23 January 2015 and estimated to air a total of 10 episode.

The concept of this program will follow celebrities becoming virtual family members, going overseas to live and adapting to their lifestyles.

Cast
Lee Moon-sik Role: Father
Shim Hye-jin Role: Mother
Kang Min-hyuk Role: Son 
Choi Jung-won Role: Eldest Daughter (EP 1 - 5)
Kim Seolhyun Role: Youngest Daughter (Maknae)
Park Myeong-su Role: Uncle
Park Joo-mi Role: Uncle's Wife (EP 6 - 10)

History
Brave Family replaced I Am a Man, a talk show taken off air after its final episode on 19 December 2014.

This show took place in Cambodia and Laos, filming of first part took place on 2 January 2015 to 8 January 2015 at Cambodia and expected to aired on mid-January 2015.

List of Brave Family episode

(Ratings: Nielsen Korea provided)

References

External links
 
 

Korean-language television shows
South Korean television talk shows
South Korean variety television shows
2015 South Korean television series debuts